Liu Yuan (劉淵) (died 19 August 310), courtesy name Yuanhai (元海), formally Emperor Guangwen of Han (Zhao) (漢(趙)光文帝) was the founding emperor of the Xiongnu-led Han Zhao dynasty during the Sixteen Kingdoms period of China.

Family background
Liu Yuan was a member of Xiongnu nobility, as a descendant of Modu Chanyu, who, along with their people, had long been loyal vassals to the Han Dynasty and to its successor states Cao Wei and Jin.  In late Cao Wei or early Jin times, the Xiongnu nobles claimed that they were descendend from the Han Dynasty's ruling Liu clan also — through a princess who had married the first great chanyu in Xiongnu history, Modu Shanyu - and therefore changed their family name to Liu.  Liu Yuan's father, Liu Bao, was a son of one of the last chanyus, Yufuluo, and the nephew of the very last chanyu Luanti Huchuquan (before Cao Cao abolished the office in 216 and divided the Xiongnu into five tribes (bu, 部)); Liu Bao had the command of the Left Tribe (左部).  Liu Yuan's mother Lady Huyan (呼延) appeared to be from a noble family, and was in probability Liu Bao's wife, not concubine, but that is not clear, with other sources state this was a name for Cai Wenji.  As all five tribes settled down in modern southern Shanxi, that was likely where Liu Yuan was born and raised.

As Jin subject
As powerful Xiongnu nobles were usually encouraged or pressured by Cao Wei and Jin authorities to send their sons to the capital Luoyang (both to encourage them to further sinicization and as collateral for their loyalty), Liu Yuan was sent to Luoyang to reside and to study traditional Chinese literature.  He became well known for his studies, particularly of the Zou version of Confucius' Spring and Autumn Annals and of the military strategies of Sun Tzu and Wu Qi.  The key Jin official Wang Hun (one of the lead generals who later participated in conquering Eastern Wu) became impressed with him, and Wang Hun's son Wang Ji (王濟) became a close friend of Liu Yuan's.  Wang Hun believed Liu to be general material and repeatedly recommended Liu Yuan to Emperor Wu, but Kong Xun (孔恂) and Empress Yang Zhi's uncle Yang Ji (楊濟) suspected Liu for his Xiongnu ancestry and persuaded Emperor Wu against giving Liu military commands during campaigns against Eastern Wu and the Xianbei rebel Tufa Shujineng.  Eventually, even Emperor Wu's brother Sima You the Prince of Qi, impressed and fearful of Liu's abilities, encouraged Emperor Wu to have Liu executed, but Wang Hun persuaded Emperor Wu that it would be wrong.  When Liu Bao died, Emperor Wu permitted Liu Yuan to take over command of the Left Tribe.

As the commander of the Left Tribe, Liu became known for his fair administration of laws and willingness to listen to ideas, and also for his willingness to spread his wealth.  Therefore, the ambitious people in his region, not only of the five Xiongnu tribes but of many Han clans, flocked to him.  After Emperor Wu's death and succession by Emperor Hui, the regent Yang Jun made Liu the commander of all five tribes, but toward the end of the subsequent regency of Emperor Hui's wife Empress Jia Nanfeng, Liu was removed from that position due to his inability to stop one of his countrymen's rebellions.  Later, when Sima Ying the Prince of Chengdu became the military commander at Yecheng, he invited Liu to be one of his subordinate military commanders, and Liu accepted the invitation.

Independence from Jin
In the midst of the War of the Eight Princes, in 304, Xiongnu nobles, led by the commander of the North Tribe, Liu Xuan, tired of the Jin misrule and secretly plotted reindependence from Jin.  They sent a messenger to secretly offer Liu Yuan the title of Grand Chanyu.  Liu Yuan then told Sima Ying, who was then concerned about an attack from Wang Jun, whose troops were reinforced with Xianbei and Wuhuan soldiers, that he would be willing to mobilize Xiongnu soldiers to support Sima Ying's cause. Sima Ying agreed and allowed Liu Yuan to return to the Xiongnu tribes.

Once Liu Yuan returned to his people, he gathered 50,000 men quickly and was readying himself to rush to Sima Ying's aid, but he also publicly accepted the title of Grand Chanyu.  (Previously, Sima Ying had bestowed the title of North Chanyu on him.)  However, he then heard that Sima Ying's forces had collapsed in fear of Wang's troops and that Sima Ying had, against his prior advice, fled to Luoyang.  He then declared his people independent from Jin and further declared that, as a Han descendant, he would succeed to the Han throne, and therefore claimed the title of the King of Han—deliberately choosing a title that had been previously held by Han Dynasty's founder, Liu Bang (Emperor Gao).  He reestablished the worship of eight Han emperors—Emperor Gao, Emperor Wen, Emperor Wu, Emperor Xuan, Emperor Guangwu, Emperor Ming, Emperor Zhang, and Liu Bei (Emperor Zhaolie).  He created his wife Lady Huyan (likely a relative of his mother) princess.  (The name of Liu's state was therefore "Han," but is often referred to as "Han Zhao" or "Former Zhao" because his nephew Liu Yao, who took the throne in 318, changed the name of the state to Zhao in 319.)

Reign
For those impressed with Liu's abilities previously, however, his reign was somewhat of a let down.  He spent great energy on trying to restore the Han system of government, but he himself was unable to quickly expand his sphere of influence.  He set his capital at Lishi (離石, in modern Lüliang, Shanxi), but his control of territory became limited to that local region.  His forces were often able to achieve victories over Jin forces but unable to hold cities.  In 305, after a famine, he relocated to Liting (黎亭, in modern Changzhi, Shanxi).

As years went by, however, the various agrarian rebel generals who were resisting Jin rule, whether ethnically Wu Hu or Han, often chose to come under Liu Yuan's Han banner.  Chief among these were the Chinese general Wang Mi and the Jie general Shi Le (both of whom declared loyalty to Han Zhao in 307), who generally only nominally submitted to Liu's orders while maintaining separate power structures but who also did appear to genuinely respect and fear Liu.  As for troops under his own control, Liu largely entrusted them to his son Liu Cong the Prince of Chu and his nephew Liu Yao the Prince of Shi'an.  The four generals, while not being able to hold cities, were generally able to rove throughout northern and central China unimpeded by Jin forces, defeating most Jin generals who opposed them.

In 308, Wang's troops advanced on the Jin capital Luoyang, but was repelled.  That year, after capturing more territory, Liu Yuan moved his capital to Puzi (蒲子, in modern Linfen, Shanxi) and declared himself emperor, signifying an even more complete break from Jin.  In 309, he moved the capital once more to Pingyang (平陽, also in modern Linfen).  By this time, Liu Cong and Wang Mi had eventually been able to control all of southern Shanxi for Han Zhao, and they again attacked Luoyang, but were again repelled.

In 310, Liu Yuan grew ill, and he created his second wife Lady Dan empress and his oldest son Liu He (by his first wife Empress Huyan—who appeared to have died by this point, although her death was not mentioned in history) crown prince.  When he died later that year, Liu He became emperor.  However, only a week later, he was overthrown and killed by Liu Cong, who then became emperor.

Physical appearance

In the Book of Wei, Chinese author Wei Shou notes that Liu Yuan was over six feet tall and that he had strands of red hair in his long beard.

Skepticism over lineage 
Some modern Chinese academics, such as Tang Changru (唐长孺), cast doubt on Liu Yuan’s lineage. Tang, in particular, pointed out three reasons: Liu Bao’s lifespan was unusually long, as he served as Tuqi King in 195 and died in 279 according to Liu Yuan's entry in the Jinshu; The commander of the Left Tribe in 272 was Li Ke (李恪) and not Liu Bao according to Emperor Wu’s entry in the Jinshu, but Liu Yuan's entry states that he inherited the position from his father; And Liu Yuan was from Xinxing Commandery (新興郡; north of present-day Xinzhou, Shanxi), which would have placed him in the North Tribe (北部), so for him to hold command over the Left Tribe is odd. Tang hypothesized that Liu Yuan and Han Zhao historians may have fabricated his lineage to strengthen his legitimacy as a direct descendant of the chanyus.

Family
Consort and their eespective issue(s): 
Empress Huyan, of the Huyan clan (呼延皇后), daughter of Huyan Yi (呼延翼)
Liu He, Prince of Liang (劉和 梁王, d. 310), first son
Empress Shan, of the Dan clan (單皇后), daughter of Dan Zheng (單徵)
Liu Ai  Prince of Beihai (劉乂 北海王, d. 317), seventh son
Furen, of the Zhang clan (张夫人)
Liu Cong (劉恭, d. 310), second son
Liu Cong , the Prince of Chu (劉聰 楚王, d. 31 August 318), fourth son
Unknown
Third son
Liu Yu, the Prince of Qi (劉裕 齐王, d. 310), fifth son
Liu Long, the Prince of Lu (劉隆 鲁王, d. 310), sixth son

References

310 deaths
4th-century Chinese monarchs
Former Zhao emperors
Jin dynasty (266–420) generals
People from Lüliang
Year of birth unknown
Generals from Shanxi
Founding monarchs
Posthumous executions